James Ulysses Hughey (March 8, 1869 – March 29, 1945), born in Wakeshma, Michigan, was a pitcher for the Milwaukee Brewers (1891), Chicago Colts (1893), Pittsburgh Pirates (1896–97), St. Louis Browns/St. Louis Cardinals (1898 and 1900) and Cleveland Spiders (1899).

He led the National League in losses (30) in 1899; he was the last player in Major League Baseball to have 30 losses in a season. In 7 seasons he had a 29–80 win–loss record, 145 games (113 started), 100 complete games, 28 games finished, 1 save, 1,007.2 innings pitched, 1,271 hits allowed, 748 runs allowed, 545 earned runs allowed, 21 home runs allowed, 317 walks allowed, 250 strikeouts, 46 hit batsmen, 37 wild pitches and a 4.87 ERA. His .266 win-loss percentage is the worst all-time among all pitchers with at least 100 pitching decisions. 

He died in Coldwater, Michigan, at the age of 76.

References

External links

Jim Hughey - Society for American Baseball Research

1869 births
1945 deaths
Major League Baseball pitchers
Baseball players from Michigan
Milwaukee Brewers (AA) players
Chicago Colts players
Pittsburgh Pirates players
St. Louis Browns players
St. Louis Cardinals players
Cleveland Spiders players
19th-century baseball players
Joliet (minor league baseball) players
Fond du Lac (minor league baseball) players
Macon Central City players
Kansas City Cowboys (minor league) players
Macon Hornets players
Toledo White Stockings players
Toledo Swamp Angels players
Terre Haute Hottentots players
Toledo Mud Hens players
Shreveport Giants players
Shreveport Pirates (baseball) players